Volleyball competitions at the 2015 Pan American Games in Toronto was held from July 16 to 26 at the Direct Energy Centre (Exhibition Centre). Due to naming rights the arena was known as the latter for the duration of the games. A total of eight men's and women's teams competed in each respective tournament. The tournament was affected by the FIVB Volleyball World Grand Prix and the FIVB Volleyball World League which were played at same time.

Competition schedule

The following is the competition schedule for the volleyball competitions:

Medal table

Medalists

Qualification
A total of eight men's teams and eight women's team will qualify to compete at the games. The top three teams in the FIVB World Rankings from South America as of December 31, 2014 along with the top four from North, Central America and The Caribbean will qualify for each respective tournament. The host nation (Canada) automatically qualifies teams in both events. Each nation may enter one team in each tournament (12 athletes per team) for a maximum total of 24 athletes.

Men

Women

Participating nations
A total of ten countries qualified volleyball teams. The numbers in parenthesis represents the number of participants qualified.

See also
 Volleyball at the 2016 Summer Olympics

References

 
Events at the 2015 Pan American Games
2015
Pan American Games